Paul McGuire (born in Edinburgh, Scotland) is a former host on Canada's CMT network.

References
Paul McGuire biography at Cressman Sakamoto Agency
Blog at CMT.ca

British infotainers
Scottish male film actors
Scottish emigrants to Canada
Television personalities from Edinburgh
York University alumni
People from Thornhill, Ontario
Living people
Canadian game show hosts
Year of birth missing (living people)
Canadian VJs (media personalities)